Homero Cárpena (14 February 1910 – 17 January 2001) was an Argentine film actor born in Mar del Plata. He appeared in 72 films between 1933 and 1972 although the bulk of his work was in the late 1930s and 1940s. He starred in El hombre señalado, which was entered into the 7th Berlin International Film Festival.
He was the father of actresses Claudia Cárpena and Nora Cárpena.

Selected filmography
 Los tres berretines (1933)
 The Boys Didn't Wear Hair Gel Before (1937)
 La fuga (1937)
 The Caranchos of Florida (1938)
 Encadenado (1940)
 El Fin de la noche (1944)
 Our Natacha (1944)
 La Amada Inmóvil (1945)
 Buenos Aires Sings (1947)
 Story of a Bad Woman (1948) 
 Hardly a Criminal (1949)
 The Gaucho Priest (1941)
 Los Lobos del palmar (1954)
 El hombre señalado (1957)
 El Rufián (1960)

External links

1910 births
2001 deaths
Argentine male film actors
People from Mar del Plata
20th-century Argentine male actors